The 1964 All-Star Game was the AFL's third annual season-ending showpiece, which featured the outstanding performers from the 1963 season. A team drawn from the Western Division defeated their Eastern counterparts by a score of 27–24, scoring 24 unanswered points after trailing 24–3 at halftime. The head coaches were Sid Gillman and Mike Holovak, who had faced each other in the AFL Championship game two weeks earlier, with Gillman's Chargers beating Holovak's Patriots 51–10. The MVP of that game, Keith Lincoln, was named offensive MVP of the All-Star game after rushing for 121 yards and a touchdown. Raiders linebacker Archie Matsos intercepted a pass and won the defensive MVP award.

Rosters 

The 22 offensive and defensive players for the two teams were decided by a players' vote, while head coaches Sid Gillman and Mike Holovak named the remainder of the 29-man squads, also selecting replacements for players forced to pull out.

Offense

Defense

The game 

The East dominated the opening half, scoring on four out of six possessions. West starting quarterback Tobin Rote struggled with accuracy and was intercepted twice. A pair of Chargers, Keith Lincoln and Paul Lowe scored rushing touchdowns in the 3rd quarter to get the West back into the game. It was 24–20 with barely a minute to play when Lance Alworth returned a punt to the East 43. Four plays later, backup quarterback Cotton Davidson passed to Raiders teammate Art Powell for the winning touchdown, with Powell making a tumbling catch in the end zone.

References 

1964 in the United States
American Football League All-Star Game
1963 American Football League season